Parliamentary elections were held in Norway in 1882. Whilst political parties were not officially established until 1884, there were two broad movements already in existence - one supporting the Swedish King and the existing system, and one demanding reform.

The first political party in Norway, the Liberal Party, was established ahead of the next election. This led to MPs joining the party and forming a government led by Johan Sverdrup which introduced parliamentarism to Norway on 26 June 1884.

Results

References

General elections in Norway
19th-century elections in Norway
Norway
Parliamentary